In functional analysis, the Borel graph theorem is generalization of the closed graph theorem that was proven by L. Schwartz.

The Borel graph theorem shows that the closed graph theorem is valid for linear maps defined on and valued in most spaces encountered in analysis.

Statement

A topological space is called a Polish space if it is a separable complete metrizable space and that a Souslin space is the continuous image of a Polish space. The weak dual of a separable Fréchet space and the strong dual of a separable Fréchet–Montel space are Souslin spaces. Also, the space of distributions and all Lp-spaces over open subsets of Euclidean space as well as many other spaces that occur in analysis are Souslin spaces. The Borel graph theorem states:

Let  and  be Hausdorff locally convex spaces and let  be linear.

Generalization

An improvement upon this theorem, proved by A. Martineau, uses K-analytic spaces. A topological space  is called a  if it is the countable intersection of countable unions of compact sets. A Hausdorff topological space  is called  if it is the continuous image of a  space (that is, if there is a  space  and a continuous map of  onto ). Every compact set is K-analytic so that there are non-separable K-analytic spaces.
Also, every Polish, Souslin, and reflexive Fréchet space is K-analytic as is the weak dual of a Fréchet space. The generalized theorem states:

Let  and  be locally convex Hausdorff spaces and let  be linear.

See also

References

Bibliography

External links

Functional analysis